The Battle of Chacabuco was a decisive victory fought by Chilean and Argentine forces against the Spanish forces in Chile during the Chilean War of Independence in 1817. The name Chacabuco may also refer to:

Chile 
 Chacabuco Valley, the origin of the name
 Chacabuco Cuesta, a Mountain pass through the Chilean Coast Range (Cordillera de la Costa)
 Chacabuco, an abandoned nitrate or "saltpeter" town in the Atacama Desert of northern Chile
 Chacabuco Province, a Province in central Chile
 Puerto Chacabuco, a town in Chile
 Chacabuco River, a river in Chile
 Chilean ship Chacabuco, a number of warships of Chile

Argentina 
Chacabuco, Buenos Aires, a city in Buenos Aires Province, Argentina
Chacabuco Partido, a political division in Buenos Aires Province, Argentina
Chacabuco Department, San Luis, a political division in San Luis Province, Argentina
Chacabuco Department, Chaco, a political division in Chaco Province, Argentina
Parque Chacabuco, a neighborhood in the city of Buenos Aires, Argentina
Chacabuco Park, a city park in Buenos Aires, Argentina